"Automatic (I'm Talking to You)" is a dance/pop song written by Torsten Stenzel & Adrian Zagoritis and recorded by the Dutch singer EliZe. She recorded the song in early 2005 and released it on March 7, 2005 as the second single from her debut album In Control, which was released in October 2006. The song was produced, mixed and arranged by Peter Hartmann and Jan Langhoff at the H&L Studio Copenhagen for TG Production Denmark. It was EliZe's second single to be given the title "Dancesmash" by Radio 538. It reached the top ten and peaked at number 7 in the Dutch Top 40. The song also charted in Bulgaria, Finland, Belgium, Germany and France.

Review

Review by Dirrrty Pop:

Track listings and formats

CD single
"Automatic" [radio edit] – 3:12
"Automatic" [extended edit] – 5:49
"Automatic" [remix] – 3:49
"Automatic" [Kaner remix] – 6:57 
"Automatic" [karaoke version] – 3:15
"Automatic" [enhanced video] – 3:11

Digital download
"Automatic" [radio edit] – 3:14

Charts

Weekly charts

Year-end charts

Personnel

Production
Track 3 remix & additional production by Mike van der Ark and Remco Sablerolle for Attic Productions. 
Track 4 remix & additional production by Kaner for Maratone Music, Hamburg.
Additional keyboards by Weiland/Sikorski.
Mastering by Arjan Rietvink.
Published by Casablanca/EMI Music Publ/Pigfactory Music Publishing/MusicAllStars/MundoMusic.

Single Photography
Photos by Ray Christian.
Styling by Moon V. (Kim Siderius, Samantha Richardson, Wings Byoux, Gimmicks Amsterdam, Next Issue (Uomo) Amstelveen).
Hairstyling & make-up by Jedidjah Kuijten.
Coverdesign by Marc Schilkowski.

Music Video
Video Director: Jonathan Weyland
Choreography: Eleanor Lejarde

References

External links
Lyrics for "Automatic"

EliZe songs
2005 singles
2005 songs
Spinnin' Records singles
Songs written by Torsten Stenzel